Ljubav is the second studio album by Serbian singer-songwriter Bojana Vunturišević. It was released on February 11, 2023, under Bassivity Digital. Ljubav was initially announced as Sama in February 2020. Vunturišević co-wrote the album, while the production was handled by her former Svi na Pod! bandmate Ivan Mirković Bambi, Luka Jovanović Luxonee and Slobodan Veljković Coby.

According to Vunturišević, the album was creatively influenced by the loss of her father, the COVID-19 pandemic and the copyright infringement lawsuit with her previous label. Lyrically,  Ljubav explores artist's different perspectives on love. The album was preceded by two singles: "Money" (2021) and "Ljubav" (2022).

Background
Following the release of her debut album Daljine under Mascom Records in 2017, Vunturišević released a standalone single, titled "Promašaj", in June 2019 through Bassivity Digital. The single was subsequently taken off the music platforms by the company Tim Drum Music, which is associated with Mascom and is supposed to represent artist's copyright. According to Vunturišević, TDM was negligent with her music and enforced censorship on her work outside Mascom.

After eventually reaching a settlement with TDM, Vunturišević made her comeback with the release of the album's lead single "Money" in May 2021 through Bassivity Digital. Subsequently, in June 2022, the track "Madrina" was presented at the Skale pop music festival in Herceg Novi108587 The album's title track, "Ljubav", was released as the second single in December of the following year. The song samples "Počnimo ljubav ispočetka" by jazz singer Beti Đorđević. "Ljubav" was enlisted by Balkanrock among the top 10 regional singles of 2022.

Promotion
In March 2023, Vunturišević announced her solo concert in Belgrade Youth Center for April 13. She is also set to performer at MENT showcase festival in Ljubljana, Slovenia in late March.

Track listing

Personnel

Musicians

 Bojana Vunturišević - lead vocals
 Andrijana Belović - background vocals (1)
 Anjuta Janković - background vocals (1)
 Milica Tegeltija - background vocals (1)
 Mina Tegeltija - background vocals (1)
 Katarina Mitić - background vocals (1)
 Tamara Novaković - background vocals (1)
 Ivana Peters - background vocals (2)
 Daria Hodnik - background vocals (10)
 Peđa Militinović - drums (1)
 Ivan Mirković Bambi - bass guitar (1, 3), guitar (2)
 Vuk Starinac - bass guitar (1)
 Miloš Nikolić - trumpet (1)

Technical
 Luka Jovanović Luxonee - production (all tracks)
 Slobodan Veljković Coby - production (1, 4, 7, 10)
 Ivan Mirković Bambi - production (3, 5)

Art
 Mladen Teofilović - photography 
 Milica Kolarić - creative director

Release history

References

2023 albums